Aditya Harlan (born 17 June 1987) is an Indonesian professional footballer who plays as a goalkeeper for Liga 1 club Persita Tangerang, on loan from Barito Putera.

Honours

Club
Persibo Bojonegoro 
 Piala Indonesia: 2012

References

External links
 
 Aditya Harlan at Liga Indonesia

1987 births
Living people
Betawi people
Indonesian footballers
Indonesian Premier League players
Liga 1 (Indonesia) players
Persibo Bojonegoro players
PS Barito Putera players
Sportspeople from Jakarta
Association football goalkeepers